Arnaud Richard  Marquesuzaa (14 June 1934 – 29 February 2020) was a French rugby union player who played centre and flanker. He won the Top 14 Championship three times: with Racing 92 in 1959, FC Lourdes in 1960, and US Montauban in 1967.

References

French rugby union players
1934 births
2020 deaths
France international rugby union players
Rugby union centres
Rugby union flankers